Tauranga Crossing is a shopping mall in Tauranga, New Zealand, located at 2 Taurikura Drive, Tauriko. It features more than 70 shops and 25 eateries. It has five anchor stores - H&M, Pak'nSave, The Warehouse, Warehouse Stationery and Noel Leeming.

Development
Stage one of the mall opened in September 2016 with 20 specialty stores and four anchor tenants: Pak'nSave, The Warehouse, Noel Leeming, and Warehouse Stationery.

Stage two opened in April 2019 with the addition of 45 new stores, 17 new dining options, and an 800-seat six-screen Event Cinemas complex with Vmax screen. The $150m expansion brought the total number of stores and eating places to more than 100 and provides employment for about 1,000 people.

Tauranga Crossing is still being developed in stages and is expected to have 70,000sq m of retail space on completion. As of 2021, the mall has more than 120 tenants, occupying more than 45,000sq m of lettable space.

See also
 List of shopping centres in New Zealand

References

External links

Shopping centres in New Zealand
Shopping centres in the Bay of Plenty Region